Events in the year 1877 in Argentina.

Incumbents
 President: Nicolás Avellaneda
 Vice President: Mariano Acosta

Governors
 Buenos Aires Province: Carlos Casares 
 Cordoba: Enrique Rodríguez then Antonio Del Viso
 Mendoza Province: Joaquín Villanueva (until 24 December); Julio Gutiérrez (from 24 December)
 Santa Fe Province: Servando Bayo

Vice Governors
 Buenos Aires Province: Luis Sáenz Peña

Events

Births
February 21 - Enrique Mosconi, military engineer
April 18 - Carlos Ibarguren

Deaths
December 29 - Adolfo Alsina

 
1870s in Argentina
History of Argentina (1852–1880)
Years of the 19th century in Argentina